Marcus Stern may refer to:

 Marcus Stern (journalist) (born 1953), American journalist
 Marcus Stern (theatre director), associate director of the American Repertory Theater